Thernand Bakouboula (born 6 March 1988 in Échirolles) is a footballer who currently plays for FC Echirolles. Born in France, he represents Congo at international level.

Career 
Bakouboula played during his career in France with FC Échirolles and Grenoble Foot 38, in Turkey for Altay Izmir and in Belgium with RJS Heppignies-Lambusart-Fleurus.

International 
He made his full international debut for Congo on 12 August 2009 in a friendly against Morocco.

Notes 

1988 births
Living people
French footballers
French sportspeople of Republic of the Congo descent
Republic of the Congo footballers
Republic of the Congo international footballers
Republic of the Congo expatriate footballers
Republic of the Congo expatriate sportspeople in Turkey
French expatriate footballers
French expatriate sportspeople in Turkey
French expatriate sportspeople in Belgium
Expatriate footballers in Turkey
Altay S.K. footballers
Expatriate footballers in Belgium
Grenoble Foot 38 players
Republic of the Congo expatriate sportspeople in Belgium
Association football forwards
People from Échirolles
Sportspeople from Isère
Footballers from Auvergne-Rhône-Alpes
Black French sportspeople